Reedy Creek, an urban watercourse that is part of the Hawkesbury-Nepean catchment, is located in Greater Western Sydney, New South Wales, Australia.

Course and features

In 2005, the Reedy Creek catchment area was rated the lowest polluting catchment out of the twenty-two catchments in the Blacktown local government area. Whilst only a small proportion of the catchment lies within the City of Blacktown, it is anticipated that future development pressure may lead to significant detrimental changes due to the altering of the run off and stream flow regime and its resulting impacts on the creek.

Reedy Creek is transversed by both the Westlink M7 and Wallgrove Road.

As part of the Streamwatch program, students from Marion Catholic Primary School compare weekly physical and chemical tests on water collected from Reedy Creek.

See also 

 Rivers of New South Wales

References

External links
 
 

Creeks and canals of Sydney
Hawkesbury River